Granowo may refer to the following villages in Poland:
 Granowo, Greater Poland Voivodeship
 Granowo, Pomeranian Voivodeship
 Granowo, West Pomeranian Voivodeship

See also
Granówko